State Route 232 (abbreviated SR 232) is a  state highway located in Oxford County in western Maine. It begins at SR 26 in Woodstock and ends at U.S. Route 2 (US 2) in Rumford.  The highway functions as an eastern bypass of SR 26 and US 2 in Bethel, providing a more direct north-south connection to and from points east.

Route description
SR 232 begins in Woodstock at SR 26 just east of Bryant Pond. It proceeds north, passing through the southeastern corner of Bethel and northwestern corner of Milton before entering the town of Rumford.

History
Most of SR 232, from its southern terminus to its intersection with South Rumford Road in Rumford near the Androscoggin River, was formerly part of SR 120 as it was designated in 1925.  When that highway was truncated to US 2 in downtown Rumford in 1955, South Rumford Road was left unnumbered and the remaining stretch south to SR 26 was renumbered to SR 232.

In 2011, the Federal Highway Administration declared the bridge structurally deficient. The new bridge opened on June 30, 2015.

Junction list

See also

References

External links

Floodgap Roadgap's RoadsAroundME: Maine State Route 232

232
Transportation in Oxford County, Maine